This is a list of the main career statistics of Serbian professional tennis player and former world No. 1, Jelena Janković. She won 15 WTA Tour singles titles including four WTA Tier I singles titles, one Premier Mandatory singles title and one Premier 5 singles title. Janković was also the runner-up in singles at the 2008 US Open, a semifinalist at the year-ending WTA Tour Championships in 2008, 2009 and 2013 and a quarterfinalist at the 2008 Beijing Olympics.

Career achievements

Janković reached her first Grand Slam semifinal at the 2006 US Open, defeating world No. 10, Nicole Vaidišová, world No. 7, Svetlana Kuznetsova, and world No. 5, Elena Dementieva, en route, before losing to world No. 2, Justine Henin, in three sets after leading 6–4, 4–2. She finished the year ranked at a then career high of world No. 12, marking her first finish in the year-end top 20.

Janković began the 2007 season by winning her second WTA Tour singles title at the Auckland Open, defeating Vera Zvonareva in the final in three sets. She reached her second consecutive final at the Sydney International but lost to Kim Clijsters in three sets, before reaching the fourth round of the Australian Open for the first time. Janković entered the top ten of the WTA rankings for the first time in her career, following these three events. In April, she won her first major title at the Family Circle Cup, defeating Dinara Safina in the final in straight sets before reaching her second Grand Slam semifinal at the French Open where she lost to the eventual champion Justine Henin, in straight sets. She also reached quarterfinals of the US Open later in the year but lost to Venus Williams, in three sets. Thanks to her results throughout the year, Janković qualified for the year-ending WTA Championships for the first time in her career. She failed to advance beyond the round-robin stage but finished the year with a career-high singles ranking of world No. 3.

Janković began the 2008 season by reaching her third Grand Slam semifinal at the Australian Open where she lost to eventual champion Maria Sharapova, in straight sets. She reached her second consecutive Grand Slam semifinal at the French Open but lost to the eventual champion Ana Ivanovic, in three sets, despite having led by a break in the deciding set. Janković achieved a new career-high singles ranking of world No. 2 following the event. On August 11, 2008, she became the world No. 1 for the first time in her career and thus becoming the first woman to do so without first reaching a Grand Slam final. The following month, Janković reached her first (and thus far only) Grand Slam singles final at the US Open but she lost in straight sets. At the year-ending WTA Championships, she lost to the eventual champion, Venus Williams, in the semifinals in three sets. However, she finished the year ranked world No. 1.

Since 2009, the highlights of Janković's career have been winning the 2009 Cincinnati Open and 2010 Indian Wells Open; a runner-up finish at the 2015 Indian Wells Open; semifinal appearances at the 2010 French Open, 2013 Miami Open and WTA Tour Championships and a quarterfinal appearance at the 2013 French Open. Janković has also captured two titles in Bogotá, Guangzhou and Hong Kong and a WTA 125 title in Nanchang. She also upset the world No. 2 and defending champion, Petra Kvitová, in three sets en route to her fifth round of 16 appearance at the Wimbledon Championships in 2015

Performance timelines

Only main draw results in WTA Tour, Grand Slam tournaments, Fed Cup and Olympic Games are included in win–loss records.

Singles

Doubles

Mixed doubles

Significant finals

Grand Slam finals

Singles: 1 (runner-up)

Mixed doubles: 1 (title)

Tier I / Premier M & Premier 5 finals

Singles: 13 (6 titles, 7 runner-ups)

Doubles: 1 (title)

WTA career finals

Singles: 36 (15 titles, 21 runner-ups)

Doubles: 5 (2 titles, 3 runner-ups)

Team

WTA 125 tournaments

Singles: 1 (title)

ITF Circuit finals

Singles: 2 (1 title, 1 runner-up)

Junior Grand Slam finals

Girls' singles: 1 title

Girls' doubles: 1 runner-up

Best Grand Slam results details

Head-to head records

Record against top-10 players
Janković's win–loss record against players who have been ranked world No. 10 or higher is as follows:

No. 1 wins

Top 10 wins

WTA Tour career earnings

*As of 6 November 2017

Career Grand Slam seedings

Double bagel matches

Notes

References

External links 
 
 
 

Tennis career statistics